Moscow City Duma District 42 is one of 45 constituencies in Moscow City Duma. The constituency covers parts of Western Moscow. District 42 was created in 2013, after Moscow City Duma had been expanded from 35 to 45 seats.

Members elected

Election results

2014

|-
! colspan=2 style="background-color:#E9E9E9;text-align:left;vertical-align:top;" |Candidate
! style="background-color:#E9E9E9;text-align:left;vertical-align:top;" |Party
! style="background-color:#E9E9E9;text-align:right;" |Votes
! style="background-color:#E9E9E9;text-align:right;" |%
|-
|style="background-color:"|
|align=left|Tatyana Batysheva
|align=left|United Russia
|
|45.37%
|-
|style="background-color:"|
|align=left|Yury Novikov
|align=left|Communist Party
|
|21.82%
|-
|style="background-color:"|
|align=left|Mikhail Menshikov
|align=left|Yabloko
|
|15.56%
|-
|style="background-color:"|
|align=left|Aleksandr Chuyev
|align=left|A Just Russia
|
|9.47%
|-
|style="background-color:"|
|align=left|Aleksey Loginov
|align=left|Liberal Democratic Party
|
|4.56%
|-
| colspan="5" style="background-color:#E9E9E9;"|
|- style="font-weight:bold"
| colspan="3" style="text-align:left;" | Total
| 
| 100%
|-
| colspan="5" style="background-color:#E9E9E9;"|
|- style="font-weight:bold"
| colspan="4" |Source:
|
|}

2019

|-
! colspan=2 style="background-color:#E9E9E9;text-align:left;vertical-align:top;" |Candidate
! style="background-color:#E9E9E9;text-align:left;vertical-align:top;" |Party
! style="background-color:#E9E9E9;text-align:right;" |Votes
! style="background-color:#E9E9E9;text-align:right;" |%
|-
|style="background-color:"|
|align=left|Yekaterina Yengalycheva
|align=left|Communist Party
|
|42.72%
|-
|style="background-color:"|
|align=left|Kirill Nikitin
|align=left|Independent
|
|20.76%
|-
|style="background-color:"|
|align=left|Pavel Ramensky
|align=left|Liberal Democratic Party
|
|9.50%
|-
|style="background-color:"|
|align=left|Boris Kagarlitsky
|align=left|A Just Russia
|
|8.89%
|-
|style="background-color:"|
|align=left|Mikhail Menshikov
|align=left|Independent
|
|8.77%
|-
|style="background-color:"|
|align=left|Olga Korshunova
|align=left|Communists of Russia
|
|3.59%
|-
|style="background-color:"|
|align=left|Marina Kostycheva
|align=left|Rodina
|
|2.74%
|-
| colspan="5" style="background-color:#E9E9E9;"|
|- style="font-weight:bold"
| colspan="3" style="text-align:left;" | Total
| 
| 100%
|-
| colspan="5" style="background-color:#E9E9E9;"|
|- style="font-weight:bold"
| colspan="4" |Source:
|
|}

References

Moscow City Duma districts